GLEE is the first full-length album originally released by Logan Lynn in 2000.  Lynn re-released the record in 2005 on his own label, Logan Lynn Music, followed by a 2008 re-release on Beat the World Records.

Debut Record
In 1998, Logan Lynn was granted a studio pass to create his first full-length album, GLEE, which was produced by Portland indie producer PFog and released on October 15, 2000.

Music video
Lynn's first music video was made for the "Here We Go Again" single, shot and directed by Bryan White and Chris Tucker, and produced by Logan Lynn Music.  The video featured scenes with Lynn singing spliced with home movies of Lynn as a child and stop-motion animation.

Track listing

References

2000 albums
Logan Lynn albums